Iwan Ries and Company is a tobacconist located in Chicago, Illinois, one of the oldest family owned tobacco companies in North America, tracing its history back to E. Hoffman & Co, which formed in 1857 which was originally owned by Edward Hoffman.  Following the Chicago Fire, the Sherman House hotel, where the E. Hoffman & Co. was based out of, was destroyed and rebuilt.  As business grew after the fire, Edward realized that he could not run the company alone and in 1891 he recruited his nephew, Iwan Ries to join him. Iwan Ries and Co. is the oldest tobacconist in Chicago.

Edward retired in 1898. Iwan sold the manufacturing business and changed the store to Iwan Ries & Co.

In 1968, the company purchased 19 S Wabash, built in 1881, where the store is located today.  Also known as the Jewelers Building, it is one of the oldest surviving building designed by Adler & Sullivan.

Three Star Tobacco, a private label pipe tobacco blend was developed in the 1950s by the Iwan Ries & Co.

References

Further reading
Cigar Aficionado
Chicago Sun-Times
Medill Reports
Medill Reports (video report)
New City
Chicago Tribune

Companies based in Chicago
Tobacco companies of the United States